Barlie is a Norwegian surname. Notable people with the surname include:

Harald Barlie (1937–1995), wrestler
Ine Barlie (born 1965), wrestler
Lene Barlie, wrestler
Mette Barlie, wrestler
Oddvar Barlie (born 1929), wrestler
Vegar Barlie (born 1972), ice hockey player

Norwegian-language surnames